The 2021–22 Furman Paladins men's basketball team represented Furman University in the 2021–22 NCAA Division I men's basketball season. The Paladins, led by fifth-year head coach Bob Richey, played their home games at Timmons Arena and Bon Secours Wellness Arena in Greenville, South Carolina as members of the Southern Conference. They finished the regular season 20–11, 12–6 in SoCon play to finish second place. They defeated Mercer and Samford in the SoCon tournament to advance to the championship game. There they lost to Chattanooga in overtime.

Previous season
In a season limited due to the ongoing COVID-19 pandemic, the Paladins finished the 2020–21 season 16–9, 10–5 in SoCon play to finish in third place. They were upset in overtime in quarterfinals of the SoCon tournament by VMI.

Roster

Schedule and results

|-
!colspan=12 style=| Non-conference regular season

|-
!colspan=12 style=| SoCon regular season

|-
!colspan=9 style=| SoCon tournament

Sources

References

Furman Paladins men's basketball seasons
Furman Paladins
Furman Paladins men's basketball
Furman Paladins men's basketball